Buddtown is an unincorporated community located within Southampton Township in Burlington County, New Jersey, United States. Located between Vincentown and Pemberton, it is named for Thomas Budd who owned farmland in the area in the 18th century. The area itself contains houses and churches in the community itself and farmland surrounding the settlement. The stream that runs through Buddtown is named Stop the Jade Run supposedly named for the cry made by the owners of a runaway horse, "jade" being an old name for a horse.

References

Southampton Township, New Jersey
Populated places in the Pine Barrens (New Jersey)
Unincorporated communities in Burlington County, New Jersey
Unincorporated communities in New Jersey